Dolo! is the debut album by pianist Dolo Coker which was recorded in 1976 and released on the Xanadu label.

Reception

The Allmusic review stated "The music is as hard swinging as one would expect from this personnel".

Track listing 
All compositions by Dolo Coker except as indicated
 "Dolo" - 7:23
 "Affair in Havana - 6:48
 "Lady Hawthorne, Please" - 6:42
 "Field Day" - 8:11
 "Never Let Me Go" (Jay Livingston, Ray Evans) - 7:20
 "Smack Up" (Harold Land) - 5:34

Personnel 
Dolo Coker - piano
Blue Mitchell - trumpet, flugelhorn (tracks 1-4 & 6)
Harold Land - tenor saxophone (tracks 1-4 & 6)
Leroy Vinnegar - bass
Frank Butler - drums

References 

Dolo Coker albums
1977 debut albums
Xanadu Records albums
Albums produced by Don Schlitten